The Big Snit is a 1985 animated short film written and directed by Richard Condie and produced by the National Film Board of Canada.

Plot
A married couple plays a game of Scrabble that has stalemated as the husband is unable to come up with a word. The two go their separate ways; he watches his favourite TV show, "Sawing for Teens," while his wife works on cleaning the house. While the husband dozes off, "Sawing for Teens" is interrupted by the emergency warning: a severe worldwide nuclear war has broken out, and the cat severs the TV's electrical cord. As the husband awakens, he looks out the window to see that the streets have descended into chaos, and he returns to the game board, unaware of the global cataclysm, and sneaking a peek at his wife's letters. The wife, finished with her cleaning and also oblivious, catches him in the act, which he denies. And then, the two begin arguing over every petty flaw each one has, up to the point where the wife runs away in tears.

The husband spots an old photo of him and his wife at "Expo 1957" (a spoof of the real-life Expo 67), prompting memories of the couple in happier times. Unable to console his wife, he begins playing the concertina (poorly), which softens his wife enough for both of them to reconcile. As the cat claws to be let outside, the husband obliges and reaches for the doorknob. At that moment, following a cutaway of a rapidly zooming-in bird's-eye view of their house, a white glow emanates from the keyhole and the husband is vapourized, implying that a nuclear bomb has hit the house and that everyone has been instantly killed.

The door then opens and, instead of chaos, a vision of Heaven is seen outside. The couple, unaware of their apparent deaths, marvels at the beauty of the scene and decides to return to their Scrabble game.

Voice cast
 Jay Brazeau as the Husband
 Ida Osler as the Wife
 Randy Woods as the "Sawing for Teens" Host
 Bill Guest as the Station Announcer

Reception and legacy
The film received 17 awards including the Grand Prize at the Montreal World Film Festival, the Special Jury Award for Humour at the Zagreb World Festival of Animated Films, the Golden Space Needle for Best Short at the Seattle International Film Festival, Best Animated Film at the Tampere Film Festival, the Silver Plaque for Animation at the Chicago International Film Festival, the Hiroshima Prize at the Hiroshima International Animation Festival, the FIPRESCI International Film Critics' Prize at the Annecy International Animated Film Festival and a Genie Award for Best Animated Short. It was also nominated for an Academy Award for Best Animated Short Film at the 58th Academy Awards.

In 1994, it was voted #25 of the 50 Greatest Cartoons of all time by members of the animation field, and was the highest ranked cartoon in the list that was from the NFB. It was also included in the Animation Show of Shows. Animation expert Charles Solomon cited it as one of the best animated films of the 1980s.

In popular culture
The Big Snit inspired a Scrabble scene in the second episode of The Simpsons' first season, "Bart the Genius".

References

External links

Canadian Film Encyclopedia

The Big Snit on BCDB

1985 films
Animated comedy films
Canadian animated short films
Canadian comedy short films
Films about nuclear war and weapons
National Film Board of Canada animated short films
Films directed by Richard Condie
Works about Scrabble
Best Animated Short Film Genie and Canadian Screen Award winners
1985 comedy films
1980s animated short films
1985 animated films
Animated films about cats
Animated films about birds
English-language Canadian films
1980s English-language films
1980s Canadian films